Proven Guilty is the 8th book in The Dresden Files, Jim Butcher's continuing series about wizard detective Harry Blackstone Copperfield Dresden. Proven Guilty had a release date of May 2, 2006.

Harry Dresden has spent years being watched and suspected by the White Council's Wardens, but now he is a Warden, and it's a worse role than he thought. When movie monsters start coming to life on his watch, it's officially up to him to put them back where they came from. Only this time, his client is the White Council, and his investigation cannot fail - no matter who falls under suspicion, no matter the cost.

The cover art by illustrator Christian McGrath depicts Harry on a street corner with his glowing staff. On Butcher's website, the first 3 chapters may be previewed.

Plot summary
Nearly a year after the events in Dead Beat, Warden Harry Dresden attends the trial and execution of a sixteen-year-old Korean boy for mentally controlling his friends and family. After the execution, Ebenezar McCoy asks Dresden to discover why the Summer and Winter Fae have not attacked the Red Court vampires, and the Gatekeeper secretly requests that Dresden investigate the use of black magic in Chicago. Back at home, Molly Carpenter summons him to the police station to bail out her boyfriend, Nelson. Molly asks Dresden to help Nelson, because she believes him to be innocent.

Harry soon finds himself investigating strange attacks happening at "SplatterCon!!!", a horror movie convention Molly and Nelson had worked at. During this investigation, he discovers that phobophages—supernatural predators from the spirit world who feed on fear—are behind the attacks, and sets out to stop them by turning them back on whoever is summoning them. After a meeting with the Summer Knight and both the Summer and Winter Ladies, he discovers that the reason Summer has not attacked the Red Court is due to their fear of an impending attack by Winter. He also learns that Mab has been acting strangely as of late.

After fighting off phobophages in the shape of a xenomorph and a horror-movie slasher, he manages to send the remainder to the source of their crossing. Before he can investigate, he and Officer Rawlins of the Chicago PD are taken captive by Madrigal Raith, Thomas' cousin, who has learned to feed off of fear himself. Escaping with the help of Mouse and Thomas, they have a narrow run-in with an incredibly powerful phobophage in the form of a scarecrow before Harry discovers that he had inadvertently sent the other phobophages after Molly, and they have taken her to the Nevernever.

Teaming up with Karrin Murphy, Charity (Molly's mother), and the Summer Knight and Lady, Harry leads an assault on Arctis Tor—the Winter stronghold, which seems to have been the site of a recent battle. Fighting their way through more phobophages, Harry and Charity Carpenter engage in a final showdown with the scarecrow phobophage, now revealed to be a powerful servant of the Winter Court known as a fetch. During the conflict, Harry blasts the Winter Fountain with Summer fire, causing every Winter Fae in Fairie to rush to Arctis Tor's defense. The group narrowly escape with their lives.

Retreating to the sanctuary of St. Mary's, Harry confronts Molly about her use of magic, informing her that she has broken the Fourth Law and that he must take her in for trial, though he promises to stand by her. At the trial, things are beginning to look grim. The Merlin has voted for numerous absent Senior Council members, and his vote is to execute Molly. With the help of the Gatekeeper, Harry manages to stall long enough for Michael Carpenter to appear with several Senior Council members, who explain that Michael had saved their lives, and vote to allow Molly to fall under the Doom of Damocles, with Harry as her mentor.

With the conflict behind them for now, Harry forces Molly to return to her parents home, and sets about teaching her how to control her magic. Later, Dresden and McCoy compare notes on the recent happenings. They agree there's a new group orchestrating events from a safe distance. Dresden refers to this group of unknown individuals as the "Black Council". They agree the attack on the training camp means there is a highly placed traitor in the White Council, maybe even on the Senior Council itself.

Introduced characters

 Darby Crane: horror movie producer, a disguise for Madrigal Raith, a White Court vampire feeding on fear.
 Lucius Glau: Crane's lawyer and a jann (child of a djinn and a mortal).
 Detective Sgt. Greene: homicide detective assigned to investigate one of Harry's cases, a skeptic about magic.
 Nelson: young drug addict whom Molly ensorcells to be afraid of narcotics to help him end his addiction.
 Rosie Marcella: young (and pregnant) drug addict whom Molly ensorcells to be afraid of narcotics so that her addiction won't harm her baby.
 Lydia Stern: news reporter for the Midwestern Arcane.

External links

 The first three chapters of the book may be found on the author's official site.
 Link to Audiobook Penguin USA

2006 American novels
American fantasy novels
Novels by Jim Butcher
The Dresden Files
Low fantasy novels
Urban fantasy novels
Roc Books books